n2n is an open source Layer 2 over Layer 3 VPN app utilising peer-to-peer architecture for network membership and routing. 

Unlike many other VPN programs, n2n can also connect computers which reside behind NAT routers. These connections are set up with help from a third computer that both computers can reach. This computer, called a supernode, can then route the information between NATed nodes.

It is free software licensed under the terms of the GNU General Public License v3.

Turbo VPN is a custom Windows server/client implementation of n2n.

References

External links
 n2n on Google Play

Free network-related software
Virtual private networks